Apio may refer to:
 Apio (surname)
 Apio (appetizer), a Balkan Jewish appetizer
 Apios americana, a perennial vine that bears edible beans and large edible tubers, common in Japan and Korea
 Celeriac, Apium graveolens, var. rapaceum, also known as celery root